Hedong is a town under the administration of Lufeng in southeastern Guangdong province, China, located north of downtown Lufeng. , it has ten villages under its administration.

See also
List of township-level divisions of Guangdong

References

Township-level divisions of Guangdong
Lufeng, Guangdong